Berezanka is an urban-type settlement in Mykolaiv Raion in the south of Mykolaiv Oblast, Ukraine. It hosts the administration of Berezanka settlement hromada, one of the hromadas of Ukraine. Population: 

Berezanka is located on the banks of the Sasik, a tributary of the Black Sea.

History
The settlement was founded in 1866 by German settlers as Alexanderfeld. It belonged to Odessky Uyezd of Kherson Governorate and was the administrative center of Aleksandrfeldskaya Volost. In 1914, after the start of World War I, it was renamed Suvorovo, to commemorate Alexander Suvorov, in a wave of eliminating German names. On 16 April 1920, Odessa Governorate split off, and Odessky Uyezd was moved to Odessa Governorate. In 1923, uyezds in Ukrainian Soviet Socialist Republic were abolished, and the governorates were divided into okruhas. In 1923, Suvorovo was renamed Tylihulo-Berezanka, and in 1966 Berezanka.

In 1923, Tylihulo-Berezanka became part of Anatolivka Raion of Odessa Okruha, with the administrative center in Anatolivka. In the same year, the center of the raion was moved to Tylihulo-Berezanka, and later raion was renamed Tylihulo-Berezanka. In 1925, the governorates were abolished, and okruhas were directly subordinated to Ukrainian SSR. In 1926, Tylihulo-Berezanka was renamed Berezanka. In 1930, okruhas were abolished, and on 27 February 1932, Odessa Oblast was established, and Tylihulo-Berezanka Raion was included into Odessa Oblast. On 22 September 1937, Mykolaiv Oblast split off Odessa Oblast, and Tylihulo-Berezanka Raion became part of newly created Mykolaiv Oblast. In January 1963, during the abortive Khrushchyov administrative reform, Tylihulo-Berezanka Raion was abolished, and Berezanka was included into Mykolaiv Raion. In 1966, Berezanka Raion was re-established in the area previously occupied by Tylihulo-Berezanka Raion. Simultaneously, Berezanka was granted urban-type settlement status.

On 18 July 2020, Berezanka Raion was abolished as part of the administrative reform of Ukraine, which reduced the number of raions of Mykolaiv Oblast to four. The area of Berezanka Raion was merged into Mykolaiv Raion.

Economy

Transportation
The M14 highway, which connects Odessa and Mykolaiv, runs immediately south of Berezanka. This stretch of the highway coincides with the European route E58.

People from Berezanka 
 Valeriy Pustovoitenko (born 1947), Ukrainian Prime Minister 1997–1999

Gallery

References

Urban-type settlements in Mykolaiv Raion
Yelisavetgradsky Uyezd